The 2015 National Women's Soccer League season was the third season of the National Women's Soccer League, the top division of women's soccer in the United States. Including the NWSL's two professional predecessors, Women's Professional Soccer (2009–2011) and the Women's United Soccer Association (2001–2003), it was the ninth overall season of FIFA and USSF-sanctioned top division women's soccer in the United States. The league is operated by the United States Soccer Federation and receives major financial backing from that body. Further financial backing is expected to be provided by the Canadian Soccer Association and the Mexican Football Federation. All three national federations pay the league salaries of many of their respective national team members in an effort to nurture talent in those nations.

In January, Jeff Plush was named NWSL commissioner, replacing Cheryl Bailey.

To accommodate the 2015 FIFA Women's World Cup the league announced it would reduce the season to 20 games while extending the calendar length into September and take a two-week break from June 7–19.

For the second straight season, FC Kansas City defeated the Shield winners Seattle Reign FC 1–0 to win the NWSL title on October 1.

Teams, stadiums, and personnel

Stadiums and locations 

Two teams, the Dash and Reign, do not make their stadiums' entire capacity available for home games, instead restricting ticket sales at a lower level. The full capacities of their venues are included in parentheses and italics.

Personnel and sponsorship 

Note: All of the teams use Nike as their kit manufacturer.

Player acquisition 

Players were acquired through the 2015 Allocation of national team players on January 14
and the 2015 NWSL College Draft on January 16,
as well as free agency and trades.

Notable acquisitions and losses

 Carli Lloyd, the scoring and assist leader for the US women's national team in 2014, was traded from the Western New York Flash to the Houston Dash on October 16, 2014.
 Heather O'Reilly, the scoring and assist leader for the Boston Breakers in 2014, was traded from Boston to FC Kansas City on October 27, 2014.
 Samantha Kerr, the leading scorer for the Western New York Flash in 2014, was traded from Western New York to Sky Blue FC on November 24, 2014.
 Sophie Schmidt, a veteran Allocated Player for the Canadian women's national team, announced in January 2015 she would not play for either Sky Blue FC or the NWSL in order to focus on the 2015 FIFA Women's World Cup.
 Morgan Brian, the two-time Hermann Trophy winner, was chosen No. 1 overall by the Houston Dash in the College Draft on January 16, 2015.
 Jessica McDonald, the leading scorer for the Portland Thorns in 2014, was traded from Portland to the Houston Dash during the draft on January 16, 2015.
 Jodie Taylor, the leading scorer for the Washington Spirit in 2014, was traded from Washington to the Portland Thorns during the draft on January 16, 2015.
 Abby Wambach, the scoring and assist leader for the Western New York Flash in 2013, announced on March 18, 2015 she would not play for either Western New York or the NWSL in order to focus on the 2015 FIFA Women's World Cup. Her rights were subsequently traded to the Seattle Reign in exchange for Sydney Leroux.

Competition format 

 Each team will play a total of 20 games, 10 home and 10 away.
 Each team will play all opponents twice, once home and once away, plus four opponents an extra time, split two opponents at home and two away.
 The four teams at the end of the season with the most points will qualify for the playoffs.

Results table 

Scores listed as home-away

League standings

Tiebreakers 

The initial determining factor for a team's position in the standings is most points earned, with three points earned for a win, one point for a draw, and zero points for a loss. If two or more teams tie in point total, when determining rank and playoff qualification and seeding, the NWSL uses the following tiebreaker rules, going down the list until all teams are ranked.

If two teams tie:

 Head-to-head win–loss record between the two teams.
 Greater goal difference across the entire season (against all teams, not just tied teams).
 Greatest total number of goals scored (against all teams).
 Apply #1–3 to games played on the road.
 Apply #1–3 to games played at home.
 If teams are still equal, ranking will be determined by a coin toss.

If three or more teams tie, the following rules apply until only two teams remain tied, at which point the two-team tiebreakers listed above are used:

 Points per game against all other tied teams (total all points earned in games against tied teams and divide by games played against tied teams).
 Greater goal difference across the entire season (against all teams, not just tied teams).

Weekly live standings 

Considering each week to end on a Sunday

Statistical leaders

Top scorers

Top assists 

|}

Goalkeeping 

(Minimum of 900 minutes played)

NWSL Playoffs 

The top four teams from the regular season will compete for the NWSL Championship.

Semi-finals

Championship

Individual awards

Monthly awards

Weekly awards

Annual awards

References

External links 

 
2015
1